Notophyson brotes is a moth of the subfamily Arctiinae. It was described by Herbert Druce in 1895. It is found in Guyana.

References

Arctiinae
Moths described in 1895